Oscar Blumenthal or Oskar Blumenthal (13 March 1852 Berlin - 24 April 1917, Berlin) was a German playwright and drama critic.

Biography
Blumenthal was educated at the gymnasium and the university of his native town, and at Leipzig University, where he received the degree of doctor of philosophy in 1872. After having been editor of the Deutsche Dichterhalle in Leipzig, he founded in 1873 the Neue Monatshefte für Dichtkunst und Kritik. In 1875 Blumenthal moved to Berlin, where he became theatrical critic of the Berliner Tageblatt, holding this position until 1887, when he opened the Lessing Theater, of which he was director till 1898. From 1894 to 1895 he was also director of the Berliner Theater. From 1898 he was engaged exclusively in literary work.

Blumenthal was well known as a critic and playwright. His critiques in the feuilletons of the newspapers sparkle with humour, at the same time doing justice to authors and actors. Because of their sharpness he was sometimes called "bloody Oscar". His plays have had merited success, and many of them were well received at the leading German theaters. Together with Gustav Kadelburg he wrote several comedies like the famous The White Horse Inn. As a researcher in literature he became famous for his edition of the works of Christian Dietrich Grabbe. He also was successful a theatrical manager.

Blumenthal is also known for his humorous short poems, for example:

Das ist ein hässliches Gebrechen,
Wenn Menschen wie die Bücher sprechen.
Doch reich und fruchtbar sind für jeden
Die Bücher, die wie Menschen reden.

(It is a terrible flaw
When people speak like books,
But good and useful for everyone
Are books that speak like people).

Literary works 
Blumenthal is the author of many plays and novels, among which may be mentioned:

Allerhand Ungezogenheiten, Leipzig, 1874, 5th ed., 1877;
Für alle Wagen- und Menschenklassen, ib. 1875;
Bummelbriefe, Danzig, 1880;
 Merkzettel, 1898;
 Verbotene Stücke, 1900;
 Gesammelte Epigramme, 1890
He also edited Grabbes Werke und handschriftlicher Nachlass, ib. 1878.

Plays
Der Probepfeil (1883)
Frau Venus (with Ernst Pasqué, 1883)
Die grosse Glocke (1884)
Ein Tropfen Gift (1885)
Der schwarze Schleier (1886)
Anton Antony (1887)
Der Zaungast (1889)
Das zweite Gesicht (1890)
 (with Gustav Kadelburg, 1891) (produced in English by Augustin Daly as A Test Case: Or, Grass Versus Granite; modern title: A Marriage Contract)
Heute und Gestern (1891)
Die Orientreise (with Gustav Kadelburg, 1892) (produced in English by Augustin Daly as The Orient Express, translated by F. C. Burnand)
Mauerblümchen (with Gustav Kadelburg, 1893)
Paulas Geheimnis (1893)
Zwei Wappen (with Gustav Kadelburg, 1894) (English adaption: The Two Escutcheons, by Sydney Rosenfeld)
Gräfin Fritzi (1895)
Das Einmaleins (1896)
Hans Huckebein (with Gustav Kadelburg, 1897) (English adaption: Number 9 – The Lady of Ostend, by F. C. Burnand)
Matthias Gollinger (with Max Bernstein, 1898)
The White Horse Inn (with Gustav Kadelburg, 1898)  (First English adaption: At the White Horse Tavern, by Sydney Rosenfeld)
Auf der Sonnenseite (with Gustav Kadelburg, 1898)
Als ich wiederkam (with Gustav Kadelburg, 1899, sequel to The White Horse Inn) (English adaption: Twelve Months Later)
Die strengen Herren (with Gustav Kadelburg, 1900)
Die Fee Caprice (1901)
Das Theaterdorf (with Gustav Kadelburg, 1902)
Der blinde Passagier (with Gustav Kadelburg, 1902)
Der letzte Funke (with Gustav Kadelburg, 1906)
Die Tür ins Freie (with Gustav Kadelburg, 1908) (English adaption: Is Matrimony a Failure?, 1909, by Leo Ditrichstein)
Die große Pause (with Max Bernstein, 1915)
Die Schöne vom Strand (with Gustav Kadelburg, 1915, musical version of Hans Huckebein, music by )

Filmography
Is Matrimony a Failure?, directed by James Cruze (1922, based on the play Die Tür ins Freie)
The White Horse Inn, directed by Richard Oswald (1926, based on the play The White Horse Inn)
When I Came Back, directed by Richard Oswald (1926, based on the play Als ich wiederkam)
The Long Intermission, directed by Carl Froelich (1927, based on the play Die große Pause)
The White Horse Inn, directed by Karel Lamač (1935, based on the operetta The White Horse Inn)
White Horse Inn, directed by Benito Perojo (Argentina, 1948, based on the operetta The White Horse Inn)
The White Horse Inn, directed by Willi Forst (1952, based on the operetta The White Horse Inn)
The White Horse Inn, directed by Werner Jacobs (1960, based on the operetta The White Horse Inn)
Summer in Tyrol, directed by Erik Balling (Denmark, 1964, based on the operetta The White Horse Inn)

References

External links 
 
 
(see image) Oskar Blumenthal
 

1852 births
1917 deaths
Writers from Berlin
People from the Province of Brandenburg
19th-century German Jews
German theatre critics
German theatre managers and producers
19th-century German novelists
20th-century German novelists
German male novelists
German male dramatists and playwrights
19th-century German dramatists and playwrights
20th-century German dramatists and playwrights
19th-century German male writers
19th-century German writers
20th-century German male writers
German male non-fiction writers